In combat sports, a cornerman, or second, is a coach or trainer assisting a fighter during a bout. The cornerman is forbidden to instruct and must remain outside the combat area during the round. In the break, they are permitted to enter the ring and minister to their fighter.

The cornerman may perform cutman duties such as applying ice or adrenaline to reduce swelling and stop bleeding. The cornerman may also be responsible for throwing in the towel when necessary.

Notable cornermen
 Ray Arcel
 Teddy Atlas
 George Benton
 Ignacio Beristáin
 Chuck Bodak, a legendary boxing cutman and trainer who worked with over 50 World Champions including Muhammad Ali, Rocky Marciano, Tommy Hearns, Julio César Chávez, Evander Holyfield, and Oscar De La Hoya.
 Drew Bundini Brown, an assistant trainer and cornerman of the American 20th Century boxer Muhammad Ali.
 Gil Clancy
 Cus D'Amato
 Angelo Dundee, an American boxing trainer and cornerman best known for his work with Muhammad Ali (1960–1981).
 Lou Duva
 Eddie Futch
 Robert Garcia
 Buddy McGirt
 Eddie Mustafa Muhammad
 Freddie Roach
 Kevin Rooney
 Abel Sanchez
 Ronnie Shields
 Emanuel Steward

References

Boxing people